The Paul McCartney Collection is a series of 16 remastered CDs by Paul McCartney of his solo and Wings albums, with most adding bonus tracks. The albums in the collection were released separately, with the first eight released on 7 June 1993, and the remainder on 9 August of the same year. The first half comprised albums from McCartney (1970) to London Town (1978), and the second half Wings Greatest (1978) to Flowers in the Dirt (1989). A box set of all 16 discs was subsequently released in the Japanese Beatles Fan Club.

The re-issues did not include McCartney's most recent studio album, Off the Ground, released in February 1993, and were not released in the United States.

Contents

References

Paul McCartney compilation albums
1993 compilation albums